Donald Clarence McVilly (7 August 1920 – 17 August 1996) was an Australian rules footballer who played with Hawthorn in the Victorian Football League (VFL).

Prior to playing with Hawthorn, McVilly briefly served in the Merchant Navy during World War II.

Notes

External links 

1920 births
1996 deaths
Australian rules footballers from Tasmania
Hawthorn Football Club players
Glenorchy Football Club players
Australian military personnel of World War II